Eric Bogle (born 23 September 1944) is a Scottish-born Australian folk singer-songwriter. Born and raised in Scotland, he emigrated to Australia at the age of 25, to settle near Adelaide, South Australia. Bogle's songs have covered a variety of topics and have been performed by many artists. Two of his best known songs are "No Man's Land" (or "The Green Fields of France") and "And the Band Played Waltzing Matilda", with the latter named one of the APRA Top 30 Australian songs in 2001, as part of the celebrations for the Australasian Performing Right Association's 75th anniversary.

Early years
Eric Bogle was born on 23 September 1944 in Peebles, Scotland. His father was a railway signalman who played the bagpipes. Bogle started writing poetry when he was eight years old. After attending school until he was sixteen, Bogle worked in various trades: labourer, clerk and barman. In 1969, Bogle emigrated to Australia and initially lived in the capital, Canberra, where he worked as an accountant. He had an interest in politics and by 1980 had moved to Queensland before settling in Adelaide.

Career 

Bogle taught himself to play guitar and joined a skiffle and rock band. He was the leader of Eric and the Informers in Scotland. His early influences were Lonnie Donegan, Elvis Presley and Ewan MacColl. He turned to folk music prior to emigrating to Australia – his first written songs concerned his parents. One of these, "Leaving Nancy", which sang of the day he left home for Australia, being the last time he saw his mother Nancy, was often covered, most notably by The Dubliners and The Fureys. When living in Canberra he joined the local folk music scene and performed occasionally.

Several of his most famous songs tell of the futility or loss of war. Prominent among these is "And The Band Played Waltzing Matilda", written in 1971, covered later by Joan Baez. The lyrics recount the experiences of a member of the Australian and New Zealand Army Corps (ANZAC) in the Battle of Gallipoli. It has also been interpreted as a reaction to the Vietnam War.

Another of his best-known songs, "No Man's Land", is also World War I-themed. This song is commonly known as "The Green Fields of France", a title it was first given by The Fureys and which has subsequently been used in many further cover versions. The song refers to the traditional Scottish song "Flowers of the Forest" being played over the grave of a World War I soldier. Bogle deliberately gave the dead soldier an Irish name ("Willie McBride") as a counter to the anti-Irish sentiment prevalent in Britain during the 1970s. This song has been covered by Alex Beaton (with "A Scottish Soldier" from The Water is Wide), Plethyn ("Gwaed ar eu Dwylo" (Blood on their Hands), sung in Welsh from "Blas y Pridd"), Hannes Wader ("Es ist an der Zeit" (It is the Time)), and Dutch folk band Wolverlei as "14-18". American folk singer Charlie Zahm also has a version on his album Festival Favorites, as does American Folk Singer Robert Marr on his 2011 album Celticism. The lyrics from the song were referred to by former British Prime Minister Tony Blair in 2003 as his favourite anti-war poem.

"As if he Knows" (2001) widens the theme of the wastage of war to describe the sadness of Australian mounted soldiers in Palestine in 1918 as they are obliged to shoot their horses, "who asked so little and gave so much", before embarkation.

Another notable song on a similar theme, but with a more contemporary setting, is the Troubles-inspired "My Youngest Son Came Home Today", with its tale of a young man killed during fighting in Northern Ireland. Notably, the song does not take sides in the conflict; it does not mention whether the title character is a nationalist or loyalist. However, the song has been adopted by Nationalists and is now associated with Irish Republicanism. When Billy Bragg covered the song, he changed the line "dreams of freedom unfulfilled" (which echoes the language of Nationalists) to "dreams of glory unfulfilled". Memorable gigs can be recalled by fellow artists such as Fran Malone who played with Eric in An Rinn in the 1990s.

Bogle's songs cover a wide range of subjects and themes, including comedic songs ("The Aussie Bar-B-Q"), satires ("I Hate Wogs"), protest songs and serious songs about the human condition such as "Now I'm Easy". His song "Safe in the Harbour" is an homage to Stan Rogers. "Katie and the Dreamtime Land" is a tribute to American folk singer Kate Wolf, who died from leukemia in 1986. Other well-known songs, with lighter subject matter, include two homages to departed pets, "Little Gomez" and "Nobody's Moggy Now" and an acknowledgment of his folk music fans with "Do You Sing Any Dylan?".

In 2000 a five-CD collection, Singing The Spirit Home, was released. His first and only live performance DVD was released in May 2009.

Touring

Bogle has undertaken an extensive concert tour of the UK (sometimes including appearances in continental Europe as well), every three years since 1985. These tours have usually included a supporting cast of Australian-based singers and musicians, most regularly John Munro and Brent Miller. Bogle said that his 2009 tour, with John Munro, would be his last overseas tour. This featured a Saturday Night Special on 27 June with Martyn Wyndham-Read, Johnny Collins and Les Sullivan in Watford, the closest venue to London.

More recent tours in Australia have included Adelaide-based musicians Emma Luker (fiddle) and Pete Titchener (guitar/bass)

Bogle was a prominent artist at the National Folk Festival in Canberra over Easter 2011, has been a regular artist at the Port Fairy Folk Festival held in Port Fairy, Victoria, Australia every March.

Many of Bogle's songs have been covered by other artists; including Joan Baez, John Schumann, The Skids, June Tabor, The Men They Couldn't Hang, The Clancy Brothers, The Dubliners, John McDermott, Liam Clancy, Mike Harding, The Pogues, De Dannan, Dropkick Murphys, The Corries, Billy Bragg, The Bushwackers, Slim Dusty, Mary Black, The Fureys and John Williamson. In May 2001 the Australasian Performing Right Association (APRA), as part of its 75th Anniversary celebrations, named his song, "And the Band Played Waltzing Matilda", as one of the Top 30 Australian songs of all time.

Discography

Studio albums

Live albums

Compilations

Videos

Awards
On 25 January 1987, Bogle was appointed a Member of the Order of Australia, "In recognition of service to the performing arts as a song writer and singer."

ARIA Music Awards
The ARIA Music Awards are an annual awards ceremony that recognises excellence, innovation and achievement across all genres of Australian music. They commenced in 1987.

! 
|-
| 1989
| rowspan="3"| Something of Value
| ARIA Award for Best Independent Release
| 
|
|-

Mo Awards
The Australian Entertainment Mo Awards (commonly known informally as the Mo Awards), were annual Australian entertainment industry awards. They recognised achievements in live entertainment in Australia from 1975 to 2016. Bogle won one award in that time.
 (wins only)
|-
| 1990
| Eric Bogle
| Folk Performer of the Year
| 
|-

National Folk Festival
 (wins only)
|-
| 2019
| Eric Bogle
| Lifetime Achievement Award
| 
|-

Tamworth Songwriters Awards
The Tamworth Songwriters Association (TSA) is an annual songwriting contest for original country songs, awarded in January at the Tamworth Country Music Festival. They commenced in 1986. Bogle won three awards.
 (wins only)
|-
| 1987
| Eric Bogle
| Songmaker Award
| 
|-
| 1988
| Eric Bogle
| Tex Morton Award
| 
|-
| 1991
| "Silly Slang Song" by Eric Bogle
| Comedy/Novelty Song of the Year 
| 
|-

References

Bibliography

External links
 

 

1944 births
APRA Award winners
Living people
Celtic folk musicians
Scottish folk singers
Scottish pacifists
Scottish singer-songwriters
People from Peebles
Scottish emigrants to Australia
Australian folk singers
Musicians from South Australia
Topic Records artists